Lophopterys is a genus in the Malpighiaceae. Lophopterys comprises seven species of woody vines and shrubs (or small trees?) of diverse habitats in South America south to about 23°.

External links
Malpighiaceae Malpighiaceae - description, taxonomy, phylogeny, and nomenclature
Lophopterys

Malpighiaceae
Malpighiaceae genera